"Either Way" is a song written by Chris Stapleton, Tim James and Kendell Marvel. It is the first single off Stapleton's 2017 album From A Room: Volume 1. The song was first recorded by Lee Ann Womack on her 2008 album Call Me Crazy. It won the award for Best Country Solo Performance at the 60th Grammy Awards.

Content
"Either Way" is a country ballad performed with an acoustic guitar. Lyrically, is about the end of a relationship. Some reviewers opined in the song Stapleton offers a sparsely arranged requiem for a dormant marriage, telling the painful tale of a union nearing its end.

Critical reception
For Will Hermes of Rolling Stone, the ballad is set to acoustic guitar "that goes from broken whisper to chilling holler, with extravagantly curled phrasing informed, one imagines, by hours spent watching smoke plumes rise toward the ceiling." Also in Rolling Stone, reviewer Robert Crawford wrote the studio version "doesn't differ much from that first live performance, with Stapleton screaming heartbroken lyrics over acoustic guitar arpeggios. Simple and stunning."

Writing for Taste of Country, Billy Dukes commented the record "is a tremendous vocal performance that assures fans he’ll continue to be the gold standard moving forward. His guitar shadows him as Stapleton works up the scale at each thundering chorus. Contrast the power of his vocals with the dark, fragile and hopeless nature of his lyrics."

Commercial performance
The song debuted on Billboard'''s Hot Country Songs at No. 17 as the third best-selling country song of the week, with 23,000 copies sold.  After his performance on the finale of The Voice, it sold a further 21,000 copies. It has sold 87,000 copies as of June 2017.

Live performances
On May 23, 2017, Stapleton performed "Either Way" on the season 12 finale of The Voice.

Cover versions
Australian Judah Kelly covered the song on his debut album, Count On Me'' (2017).

Charts

Weekly charts

Year-end charts

Certifications

Notes

References

External links

2008 songs
2017 singles
Chris Stapleton songs
Lee Ann Womack songs
Songs written by Tim James (country music songwriter)
Songs written by Kendell Marvel
Songs written by Chris Stapleton
Song recordings produced by Dave Cobb
Country ballads